Kastoori is a 2019 Indian Hindi language film directed by Vinod Uttreshwar Kamble. The film won Best Children's film national award in the 67th National Film Awards 2019.

References

External links
 

Best Children's Film National Film Award winners
2019 films
2010s Hindi-language films